Akkalkot State during the British Raj, was a Maratha princely state ruled by the Bhonsle dynasty. The non-salute state came under the Deccan States Agency and was bordered by Hyderabad State and the Bombay Presidency.

See also
 Maratha Empire
 List of Maratha dynasties and states
 List of Indian princely states

References

Princely states of Maharashtra
Solapur district
1708 establishments in Asia

fr:Akalkot